Beth O'Connor is an American politician and activist from Maine. O'Connor, a Republican from Berwick, Maine, has served in the Maine House of Representatives since December 2014. She also served a single term from 2011 to 2012.

O'Connor has also served as chairwoman of Maine Taxpayers United.

O'Connor served for seven months as vice-chairwoman of the Maine Republican Party. She resigned on June 28, 2013, citing Republican legislators lack of support for Republican Governor Paul LePage's biennial budget.

References

Year of birth missing (living people)
Living people
People from Berwick, Maine
Republican Party members of the Maine House of Representatives
Women state legislators in Maine
21st-century American politicians
21st-century American women politicians